Seseli is a genus of herbaceous perennial plants in the family Apiaceae. They are sometimes woody at base with a conic taproot. Leaf blades are 1–3-pinnate or pinnately decompound. Umbels are compound, with bracts few or absent. Petals are white or yellow, and the fruit ovoid or ellipsoid.

There are about 140 species in the genus.

Species 
, Plants of the World Online accepted the following species:

Seseli abolinii (Korovin) Schischk.
Seseli acaulis (R.H.Shan & M.L.Sheh) V.M.Vinogr.
Seseli aemulans Popov
Seseli afghanicum (Podlech) Pimenov
Seseli alaicum Pimenov
Seseli albescens (Franch.) Pimenov & Kljuykov
Seseli alboalatum (Haines) Pimenov & Kljuykov
Seseli alexeenkoi Lipsky
Seseli andronakii Woronow ex Schischk.
Seseli annuum L.
Seseli arenarium M.Bieb.
Seseli aroanicum Hartvig
Seseli asperulum (Trautv.) Schischk.
Seseli atlanticum Boiss.
Seseli austriacum (Beck) Wohlf.
Seseli besserianum Stoyanov & Ostr.
Seseli betpakdalense Bajtenov
Seseli bocconei Guss.
Seseli buchtormense (Fisch. ex Hornem.) W.D.J.Koch
Seseli bulgaricum P.W.Ball
Seseli calycinum (Korovin) Pimenov & Sdobnina
Seseli campestre Besser
Seseli cantabricum Lange
Seseli condensatum (L.) Rchb.f.
Seseli coreanum H.Wolff
Seseli coronatum Ledeb.
Seseli corymbosum Boiss. & Heldr.
Seseli crithmifolium (Juss. ex DC.) Boiss.
Seseli cuneifolium M.Bieb.
Seseli degenii Urum.
Seseli delavayi Franch.
Seseli denudatum Boiss.
Seseli dichotomum Pall. ex M.Bieb.
Seseli diffusum (Roxb. ex Sm.) G.Hend. & Hume
Seseli djianeae Gamisans
Seseli eriocarpum (Schrenk) B.Fedtsch.
Seseli eriocephalum (Pall. ex Spreng.) Schischk.
Seseli eryngioides (Korovin) Pimenov & V.N.Tikhom.
Seseli farrenyi Molero & J.Pujadas
Seseli fasciculatum (Korovin) Korovin ex Schischk.
Seseli foliosum (Sommier & Levier) Manden.
Seseli galioides Lazkov
Seseli galloprovinciale Reduron
Seseli ghafoorianum (Akhani) Pimenov & Kljuykov
Seseli giganteum Lipsky
Seseli glabratum Willd. ex Schult.
Seseli globiferum Vis.
Seseli gouanii W.D.J.Koch
Seseli gracile Waldst. & Kit.
Seseli grandivittatum (Sommier & Levier) Schischk.
Seseli grubovii V.M.Vinogr. & Sanchir
Seseli gummiferum Pall. ex Sm.
Seseli halkensis C.Catt., Kit Tan & Biel
Seseli hartvigii Parolly & Nordt
Seseli heterophyllum Janka
Seseli hippomarathrum Jacq.
Seseli iliense (Regel & Schmalh.) Lipsky
Seseli × inaequale N.Terracc.
Seseli incanum (Stephan ex Willd.) B.Fedtsch.
Seseli incisodentatum K.T.Fu
Seseli intramongolicum Ma
Seseli intricatum Boiss.
Seseli jinanense (L.C.Xu & M.D.Xu) Pimenov
Seseli jomuticum Schischk.
Seseli junatovii V.M.Vinogr.
Seseli karateginum Lipsky
Seseli kaschgaricum Pimenov & Kljuykov
Seseli kiabii (Akhani) Akhani
Seseli korovinii Schischk.
Seseli korshinskyi (Schischk.) Pimenov
Seseli krylovii (V.N.Tikhom.) Pimenov & Sdobnina
Seseli lancifolium (K.T.Fu) Pimenov
Seseli lanzhouense (K.T.Fu ex R.H.Shan & M.L.Sheh) V.M.Vinogr.
Seseli laticalycinum (R.H.Shan & M.L.Sheh) Pimenov
Seseli lehmannianum Boiss.
Seseli lehmannii Degen
Seseli leptocladum Woronow
Seseli leucospermum Waldst. & Kit.
Seseli libanotis (L.) W.D.J.Koch
Seseli longifolium L.
Seseli luteolum Pimenov
Seseli mairei H.Wolff
Seseli malyi A.Kern.
Seseli marashica E.Doğan & H.Duman
Seseli marginatum (Korovin) Pimenov & Sdobnina
Seseli merkuloviczii (Korovin) Pimenov & Sdobnina
Seseli mironovii (Korovin) Pimenov & Sdobnina
Seseli montanum L.
Seseli mucronatum (Schrenk) Pimenov & Sdobnina
Seseli nemorosum (Korovin) Pimenov
Seseli nevskii (Korovin) Pimenov & Sdobnina
Seseli nortonii Fedde ex H.Wolff
Seseli nudum (Lindl.) Pimenov & Kljuykov
Seseli olivieri Boiss.
Seseli osseum Crantz
Seseli pallasii Besser
Seseli parnassicum Boiss. & Heldr.
Seseli peixotoanum Samp.
Seseli pelliotii (H.Boissieu) Pimenov & Kljuykov
Seseli petraeum M.Bieb.
Seseli petrosciadium Pimenov & Kljuykov
Seseli peucedanoides (M.Bieb.) Koso-Pol.
Seseli polyphyllum Ten.
Seseli ponticum Lipsky
Seseli praecox (Gamisans) Gamisans
Seseli purpureovaginatum R.H.Shan & M.L.Sheh
Seseli resinosum Freyn & Sint.
Seseli rhodopeum Velen.
Seseli rigidum Waldst. & Kit.
Seseli rimosum Pimenov
Seseli roylei (Lindl.) Pimenov & Kljuykov
Seseli rupicola Woronow
Seseli sandbergiae Fedde ex H.Wolff
Seseli schrenkianum (C.A.Mey. ex Schischk.) Pimenov & Sdobnina
Seseli sclerophyllum Korovin
Seseli scopulorum C.C.Towns.
Seseli seravschanicum Pimenov & Sdobnina
Seseli serpentina B.L.Burtt ex H.Duman & E.Doğan
Seseli seseloides (Fisch. & C.A.Mey. ex Ledeb.) M.Hiroe
Seseli sessiliflorum Schrenk
Seseli setifera (Korovin ex Pavlov) M.Hiroe
Seseli sibiricum (L.) Garcke
Seseli sibthorpii Gren. & Godr.
Seseli squarrulosum R.H.Shan & M.L.Sheh
Seseli staintonii (Riedl & Kuber) Pimenov & Kljuykov
Seseli staurophyllum Rech.f.
Seseli stewartii (M.Hiroe) Pimenov & Kljuykov
Seseli strictum Ledeb.
Seseli talassicum (Korovin) Pimenov & Sdobnina
Seseli tenellum Pimenov
Seseli tenuisectum Regel & Schmalh.
Seseli thomsonii (C.B.Clarke) Pimenov & Kljuykov
Seseli togasii (M.Hiroe) Pimenov & Kljuykov
Seseli tommasinii Rchb.f.
Seseli tortuosum L.
Seseli tragioides Pimenov
Seseli transcaucasicum (Schischk.) Pimenov & Sdobnina
Seseli turbinatum Korovin
Seseli ugoense Koidz.
Seseli unicaule (Korovin) Pimenov
Seseli valentinae Popov
Seseli vandasii Hayek
Seseli veitchii (H.Boissieu) Pimenov
Seseli wannienchun (K.T.Fu) Pimenov
Seseli yunnanense Franch.

References 

Apioideae
Apioideae genera